Zheng Shanjie (born November 1961) is a Chinese politician who has served as 14th Chairman of the National Development and Reform Commission (NDRC) since March 2023 and Governor as well as Deputy Party Secretary of Zhejiang and Party Secretary of Ningbo.

Early life and education
Zheng was born in Zhangzhou, Fujian, in November 1961. After graduating from Nanjing Tech University in 1982, he was dispatched to a factory, where he worked over a period of 15 years to the position of factory manager. He joined the Communist Party of China in June 1985.

Career
In May 1997, he was transferred to Xiamen and appointed district head of Huli District. In February 2002, he served as deputy secretary-general of Xiamen Municipal People's Government and director of General Office of Xiamen Municipal People's Government. In March 2003, he became director and party branch secretary of Xiamen Development Planning Commission. In April 2008, he left for Fuzhou, capital of Fujian province, where he was appointed deputy director of Fujian Development and Reform Commission. He rose to become director in May 2010. On February 1, 2015, he was elevated to vice-governor of Fujian.

In August 2015, he was transferred to Beijing and appointed deputy director of National Energy Administration. In April 2017, he succeeded  as deputy director of Taiwan Affairs Office.

On December 15, 2017, he was appointed Party Secretary of Ningbo and a member of the Standing Committee of the CPC Zhejiang Provincial Committee. On May 14, 2018, he was promoted to Deputy Party Secretary of Zhejiang. On September 4, 2020, he was appointed deputy governor and acting governor of Zhejiang. On September 29, he was elected governor at the Fourth session of the 13th Zhejiang Provincial People's Congress.

On September 30, 2021, he was transferred to Anhui province and appointed Party Secretary.

References

1961 births
Living people
People from Zhangzhou
Nanjing University of Technology alumni
Xiamen University alumni
People's Republic of China politicians from Fujian
Chinese Communist Party politicians from Fujian
Governors of Zhejiang